Hector Jandany (c. 1927–10 September 2006) was an influential Australian painter and a representative of Aboriginal art.

Life 
He was born c.1929 in Warmun (Turkey Creek). His father died when he was still very young, but his mother got remarried quite soon. When he was about 10 years old  he went with his relatives to Argyle to see the country of his father. Jandany stayed there with his relatives for a long time and for some time he worked as a stockman. He eventually changed a lot of jobs, working on the Texas Downs station and as a cook. 
His position as a chairman at the school of Warmun had an important impact on his life. There he tried to reinforce the teaching of the local culture and he had a strong impact into the school.

Art 
Jandany's art is strongly influenced by his personal experiences as well as the Aboriginal tradition. Thus, the country of his mother is a constant motif in his paintings. He also paints often traditional dreaming stories from the Ngarrgoorroon country. He is particularly known for using earth tones and for his restrained use of colour. Since 1990 he has participated in numerous exhibitions.

Sources 
Useful information about Jandany and pictures of his paintings at Short Street Gallery
Similar content in Art Place site
Hector Chundaloo Jandany, c. 1927-2006

Australian Aboriginal artists
20th-century Australian painters
20th-century Australian male artists
1920s births
2006 deaths
Year of birth uncertain
Indigenous Australians from Western Australia
People from Warmun Community
Australian male painters